Isochrysidales is an order of Haptophyceae.

References

Haptophyte orders
Bikont orders